Wicked Good Cupcakes is a Boston-based cupcake bakery that sells cupcakes in jars both in-store and online.

History

Wicked Good Cupcakes was formed by mother and daughter Tracey Noonan and Danielle Descroches. After taking a cake decorating class, they began posting photos of their baking online. Friends and family requested the product and Noonan and Descroches put the cupcakes in a jar in order to ship them. The company opened a store in 2011 in Cohasset.

In 2011, someone with a Wicked Good Cupcake was stopped by the TSA in Boston. The cupcake was confiscated due to the icing being considered more than the 3-ounce limit for liquids. The incident sparked an increase in sales and publicity for the company.

Wicked Good Cupcakes appeared on Season 4 of Shark Tank where it received an investment from Kevin O'Leary of $75,000 in exchange for royalties. O'Leary received $1 for every cupcake sold until his investment was repaid, and then $.45 for every cupcake thereafter.

In 2021, Wicked Good Cupcakes joined the Hickory Farms family of gourmet food gifts. Wicked Good Cupcakes gained popularity after appearing on ABC’s Shark Tank in 2013.

References

External links 
 Company website
 CNBC interview with founders

Food and drink companies established in 2011
Retail companies established in 2011
Bakeries of the United States
Companies based in Norfolk County, Massachusetts
Companies based in Massachusetts